Lycée Franco-Hellénique Eugène Delacroix (LFH/LFHED ) is a private French international school in Agia Paraskevi, Athens, Greece. It serves levels maternelle (kindergarten) until lycée (high school).

Excellence and International Perspectives 
Lycée Franco-Hellénique is ​​a very high level educational institution with an international identity, since students are from 47 different nations.

Thanks to the conclusion of the Contract with the Service for French Education Abroad, Lycée Franco-Hellénique has joined the global network of French schools abroad, which currently has 500 schools - Gymnasiums and Lyceums - in 137 countries (350,000 students). It enables a unique school journey around the world. The school's excellence is recognized in Greece as well as by the largest Universities and Schools worldwide.

The existence of an International British Department within the French department completes an already very rich educational map: it corresponds to a significant added value for students, effectively preparing them for the challenges of the 21st century and for the largest Universities worldwide.

It is recognized as a private school by the Greek Ministry of Education and gives the students of the Greek department the best choice in the country, to approach the French language and culture, precisely thanks to the high quality of the educational work and the direct contact of Greek-speaking with French-speaking students. Besides, the award of the LabelFrancEducation quality mark by AEFE in 2015 (and its renewal in 2018) highlights the quality of French teaching in the Greek department. It is also particularly facilitated to continue higher education in France.

The results of the examinations testify to the excellence of the education provided at Lycée Franco-Hellénique.

National High School Diploma of French School (DNB 2019): 100% success and 91.9% distinction (43%: Very Good, 27.9%: Good and 20.9%: Fairly Good).

National High School Diploma of France (bac 2019): 97.5% success (34.5%: Very Good, 16.9%: Good and 30.4%: Fairly Good).

Panhellenic Examinations (2019): 100% of students are admitted to Greek universities and 64.4% are admitted to the universities of Athens.

Deux mondes en un 
An island of French language and culture in Greece, the Lycée Franco-Hellenique addresses everyone (Greeks, French, third country nationals), giving students the opportunity to develop and learn Greek and French in the best possible conditions in Greece, in a strong bilingual and intercultural environment.

In this way the School ensures the uninterrupted schooling of children from families with professional obligations outside France, while allowing the children of other families to choose an original and ambitious educational proposal, having been convinced of the very high quality of our educational work.

The coexistence of two school spaces, two cultures, two languages that are spoken daily in the same place is the best symbol for the universality of knowledge. It naturally expresses the appeal of the peoples for an approach aimed at better mutual understanding and complementarity. It is an honour for Lycée Franco-Hellenique to welcome an entire section of the greek educational system and to offer its students the opportunity to discover the richness of the French language and culture.

So our children, from the youngest age to almost the beginning of adulthood, perfectly embody this ideal, handling both languages with the greatest naturalness, cultivating close friendships, drawing elements from both cultures and building bridges of understanding and knowledge.

History 
Lycée Franco-Hellenique was created in 1974, on the site of the small school "Collaros" that operated without statutes, on the premises of the French Institute of Greece on Sina Street, thanks to the political will of two heads of state, Mr. Karamanlis and Mr. Giscard d'Estaing. Their vision for convergence not only of the educational systems of the two countries but also of the respective cultures, was realized in 1975, after an exchange of letters between the two governments and the concession by the Greek state of a space to build the Greek-French school.

For this purpose and given that a foreign state is not entitled to enter into a long-term lease (99 years), a French-Hellenic association was created, the Panhellenic Association for Education (AFHE), which brought together personalities related to the development of cultural ties between of the two countries and the strengthening of the use of French in Greece.

In 1986, the two governments signed an international agreement to establish a French-Greek school that would operate as a foreign school. The charter governing its organization was published in the Greek Government Gazette in 1988. This charter was accompanied by an agreement, according to which AFHE, Union of Greek Law, grants the management of the French-Greek School (LFH) to the Union for French Language Teaching in Greece (AEFG), a French Law Association based in Paris.

Until 1990 the President of the AEFG was a representative of the Ministry of Foreign Affairs.

After the creation of the Association for French Education Abroad, its Director is appointed as Chairman of the Board of the Hellenic French School.

In July 1990, the agreement between the French and Greek governments on LFHED was published in the French Government Gazette by Decree No. 90-541.

Subsequently, between 1993 and 1996, two contracts were signed between AEFE and AEFG, which set out the terms of reference for the staff, the training framework, the location and structure of the French and Greek departments, and the award procedures. grants from the French State, the terms and conditions of remuneration of staff;

In this context, the Board of Directors of the LFH Association meets once a year, in Paris or Athens, under the chairmanship of the Director of the Association.

In 2008, the Board of Directors adopted as the name of the school : Lycée Franco-Hellénique Eugène Delacroix

See also

 Institute français de Grèce (formerly Institut français d'Athènes)

References

External links
  Lycée Franco-Hellénique Eugène Delacroix
  Lycée Franco-Hellénique Eugène Delacroix

International schools in Attica
Athens
Buildings and structures in North Athens
Agia Paraskevi
Chalandri
Educational institutions established in 1981
1981 establishments in Greece